Kuttolsheim is a commune in the Bas-Rhin department in Grand Est in north-eastern France.

It has been built along an old Roman road leading from Strasbourg to Saverne.

Geography
Saverne is approximately twelve kilometres (seven kilometres) to the north-west while Strasbourg is approximately twenty-five kilometres (fifteen miles) to the east. The twentieth century route nationale connecting the two avoids Kuttolsheim but passes through Marlenheim, a short distance to the south.

Landmarks
Sainte-Barbe chapel: classified as a historic monument; the tower has been built in the 13th century near a sultry spring, probably on the place of an elder sanctuary. The nave dates from the seventeenth century.
Schwefelsee (sulfur lake): known since the Roman era, its water was then piped to Strasbourg. The lake is a small natural water retain at the outlet of the Souffel's spring. The spring's rate of flow reaches 17 litres per second, its temperature is constant (about 12-13 °C) and therefore the lake never freezes. The sulfur content of the water allowed it to be used since the Roman era until the 1950s in thermae : its curative properties were mostly used to cure skin diseases. The lake also served as a horse bath (als: Rosschwemm) : a mild slope allows them to quietly go into water.
Saint-Jacques-le-majeur church: the choir tower, built by the architect Bernach in the 12th century, is classified as a historic monument. The present choir and nave have been rebuilt in 1865 after a fire.
Buddhist temple: Since 1978, Kuttolsheim is one of the four places in Alsace where a Buddhist centre can be found. Since it is the European Institute of Tibetan Buddhism, the Dalai Lama went there many times.

See also
 Communes of the Bas-Rhin department
 Kochersberg

References

External links

Official site

Communes of Bas-Rhin
Bas-Rhin communes articles needing translation from French Wikipedia